Calliostoma punctulatum, the spotted tiger shell, is a species of medium-sized sea snail, a marine gastropod mollusc in the family Calliostomatidae, the calliostoma top snails.

Description
The height of the shell varies between 15 mm and 50 mm. The solid, conoidal shell is imperforate. It is yellowish or light fawn-colored, unicolored or dotted on the spirals with dark brown. The granules are often white by rubbing of the cuticle. The surface of the shell is covered with narrow spiral closely and conspicuously beaded ridges, numbering 8–12 on the penultimate whorl, sometimes equal in size, sometimes alternately larger and smaller. On the next earlier (antepenultimate) whorl there are about 7, and still earlier whorls have 3 beaded carinae. The interstices are obliquely striate. The spire is a little concave in outline toward the apex. The minute apex is acute. The sutures impressed. There are about 8 or 9, convex whorls. The body whorl is rounded at the periphery. The oblique aperture is rhomboidal, pearly within, and showing folds in the nacre corresponding with the lirae outside. The pearly columella is arcuate and not tubercled below.

Distribution
This marine species is endemic to New Zealand found on rocks and at intertidal depths.

References

 Powell A. W. B., New Zealand Mollusca, William Collins Publishers Ltd, Auckland, New Zealand 1979 
 Marshall, 1995. A revision of the recent Calliostoma species of New Zealand (Mollusca:Gastropoda:Trochoidea). The Nautilus 108(4):83-127
 

punctulatum
Gastropods of New Zealand
Gastropods described in 1784